Borna Ćorić was the defending champion, but withdrew before the tournament began.

Pablo Andújar won the title, defeating Kyle Edmund in the final, 6–2, 6–2. Ranked number 355, Andújar became the lowest ranked player to win the ATP title since Lleyton Hewitt at the 1998 Adelaide International.

Seeds

Draw

Finals

Top half

Bottom half

Qualifying

Seeds

Qualifiers

Lucky loser

Qualifying draw

First qualifier

Second qualifier

Third qualifier

Fourth qualifier

References
 Main draw
 Qualifying draw

2018 Grand Prix Hassan II